Malvella is a small genus of flowering plants in the mallow family, Malvaceae. There are four species, one native to the Mediterranean, and three native to the southwestern United States and Mexico. The plants were formerly classified in genus Sida.

Description
These are generally perennial herbs, sometimes annual, growing in a prostrate or decumbent form. They are coated with star-shaped or scaly hairs. The silvery-haired leaves have asymmetrical blades. Flowers grow singly in the leaf axils. They are whitish or yellow, fading pink. The fruit is a capsule with 7 to 10 segments that do not break apart.

Species
Species include:

Malvella lepidota – scurfy mallow
Malvella leprosa – alkali mallow
Malvella sagittifolia – arrowleaf mallow
Malvella sherardiana

References

Malveae
Malvaceae genera